In econometrics and official statistics, and particularly in banking, the Divisia monetary aggregates index is an index of money supply. It uses Divisia index methods.

Background
The monetary aggregates used by most central banks (notably the US Federal Reserve) are simple-sum indexes in which all monetary components are assigned the same weight:

The summation index implies that all monetary components contribute equally to the money total, and it views all components as dollar-for-dollar perfect substitutes. It has been argued that such an index does not weight such components in a way that properly summarizes the services of the quantities of money.

There have been many attempts at weighting monetary components within a simple-sum aggregate.  An index can rigorously apply microeconomic- and aggregation-theoretic foundations in the construction of monetary aggregates. That approach to monetary aggregation was derived and advocated by William A. Barnett (1980) and has led to the construction of monetary aggregates based on Diewert's (1976) class of superlative quantity index numbers. The new aggregates are called the Divisia aggregates or Monetary Services Indexes. Salam Fayyad's 1986 PhD dissertation did early research with those aggregates using U.S. data.

This index is a discrete-time approximation with this definition:

Here, the growth rate of the aggregate is the weighted average of the growth rates of the component quantities. The discrete time Divisia weights are defined as the expenditure shares averaged over the two periods of the change

Which is the opportunity cost of holding a dollar's worth of the th asset.

In the literature on aggregation and index number theory, the Divisia approach to monetary aggregation, is widely viewed as a viable and theoretically appropriate alternative to the simple-sum approach. See, for example, International Monetary Fund (2008), Macroeconomic Dynamics (2009), and Journal of Econometrics (2011).  The simple-sum approach, which is still in use by some central banks, adds up imperfect substitutes, such as currency and non-negotiable certificates of deposit, without weights reflecting differences in their contributions to the economy's liquidity. A primary source of theory, applications, and data from the aggregation-theoretic approach to monetary aggregation is the Center for Financial Stability in New York City.  More details regarding the Divisia approach to monetary aggregation are provided by Barnett, Fisher, and Serletis (1992), Barnett and Serletis (2000), and Serletis (2007). Divisia Monetary Aggregates are available for the United Kingdom by the Bank of England, for the United States by the Federal Reserve Bank of St. Louis, and for Poland by the National Bank of Poland.  Divisia monetary aggregates are maintained for internal use by the European Central Bank, the Bank of Japan, the Bank of Israel, and the International Monetary Fund.

References 
 Barnett, William A. "The User Cost of Money".  Economics Letters (1978), 145-149.
 Barnett, William A.  "Economic Monetary Aggregates: An Application of Aggregation and Index Number Theory," Journal of Econometrics 14 (1980), 11-48.
 Barnett, William A. and Apostolos Serletis.  The Theory of Monetary Aggregation. Contributions to Economic Analysis 245. Amsterdam: North-Holland (2000).
 Barnett, William A., Douglas Fisher, and Apostolos Serletis.  "Consumer Theory and the Demand for Money".  Journal of Economic Literature 30 (1992), 2086-2119.
 Diewert, W. Erwin.  "Exact and Superlative Index Numbers".  Journal of Econometrics 4 (1976), 115-146.
 Divisia, Francois. "L'Indice Monétaire et la Théorie de la Monnaie," Revue D'Économie Politique 39 (1925), 842-864.
 Fayyad, Salam. "Monetary Asset Component Grouping and Aggregation: An Inquiry into the Definition of Money".  (Salam Fayyad's Ph.D. thesis, University of Texas, 1986.)
 International Monetary Fund.  "Monetary and Financial Statistics Compilation Guide." (2008), 183-184.
 Journal of Econometrics, special issue on "Measurement with Theory," Elsevier journal, Amsterdam, vol. 161, no. 1, March (2011).
 Macroeconomic Dynamics, special issue on "Measurement with Theory," Cambridge University Press journal, Cambridge, UK, vol 13, supplement 2 (2009).
 Serletis, Apostolos.  The Demand for Money: Theoretical and Empirical Approaches. Springer (2007).

Macroeconomic indicators
Monetary economics
Banking
Econometric modeling